The Journal of International Communication is a biannual, peer-reviewed, academic journal covering the intersection of international relations and communication studies.

Journal scope
The Journal of International Communication is a biannual, peer-reviewed journal publishing original research in communication studies and related topics within the fields of sociology, post-colonial studies, international political economy, and international relations.

Publication history
Journal of International Communication was established in 1992 and is published by Routledge. The editor-in-chief is Naren Chitty of Macquarie University.

Abstracting and indexing
Journal of International Communication is abstracted and indexed in Scopus.

Landmark papers
Landmark papers published by the journal include Roland Robertson's "Globalisation or Glocalisation?" and Halim Rane's "Social media, social movements and the diffusion of ideas in the Arab uprisings".

References

External links

Biannual journals
English-language journals
Routledge academic journals
Communication journals
Publications established in 1994